Maximilian Aichern OSB (born 26 December 1932 in Vienna) is an Austrian Catholic bishop who was the ordinary of the diocese of Linz from 1982 to 2005.

Life 
The son of Max (died 1980) and Franziska (died 1998) Aicher, he was born in Vienna.  He attended grammar school and graduated there in 1951 school respectively.  In 1954, he joined the Benedictine Monastery of St. Lambrecht in Styria. He subsequently studied in Salzburg and Pontifical Athenaeum Sant'Anselmo in Rome.

He was ordained in 1959 and was initially chaplain in St. Lambrecht and religion teacher in the local vocational school in Murau. In 1964, he abbot Koadjutor and of 24 February 1977 until 16 January 1982, he was Abbot of the monastery of St. Lambrecht. From 1978 to 1981 he was also Abbot President of the Austrian Benedictine Congregation.

In May 1981, he was informed that he was nominated as Bishop of Linz. Aichen rejected this office several times and only gave its approval in December. On 15 December 1981 the Pope appointed him official successor of Franz Zauner. Cardinal Franz König gave him the episcopal consecration in the Conception Cathedral in Linz on 17 January 1982.

His motto was: "In Caritat serve" (in German: In love serve). He was considered a "social Bishop of Austria." Within the Episcopal Conference, he was responsible for social and political issues. The working world or the sunday rest were particular concerns for him. Under his leadership in 1990, the bishops drafted a Social pastoral letter of the Catholic bishops of Austria. Also he was involved in drafting a document on the social word of the Ecumenical Council of Churches in Austria, which was published in 2003.

In the first ten years after his inauguration, he visited all 485 official parishes of the diocese as a bishop. In 2005, he surprisingly announced his resignation for reasons of age, which on 18 may Pope Benedict XVI accepted. Thereafter, he remained at the request of the Pope for the inauguration of his successor Ludwig Schwarz.

Criticism 
Groups within the diocese of Linz had criticized the bishop for allegedly violating liturgical norms set forth by the Holy See. They complained about him in Rome.

Works 

Churches and chapels in the parishes of the Diocese of Linz. An artistic, historical and pastoral documentation. Bischöfl. Ordinariate, Linz 2001,

Awards 
 2005 Great Golden Medal of Upper Austria
 2008 Erwin-Wenzl Award: Honorary Award for Lifetime Achievement

Literature 

 Christine Haiden:Maximilianstraße Aichen. Bishop with the people. Trauner, Linz 2005, 
 Peter Hofer:Attentive solidarity. Festschrift for Bishop Maximilian Aichen the seventieth birthday. Pustet, Regensburg 2002,

External links 
Diocesan Bishop Maximilian Aichen OSB
Entry on catholic-hierarchy.org

References 

Bishops of Linz
Clergy from Vienna
People from Penzing (Vienna)
1932 births
Living people
Austrian Benedictines